The 1987 Big Eight men's basketball tournament was held March 6–8 at Kemper Arena in Kansas City, Missouri.

Top-seeded Missouri defeated #2 seed Kansas in the championship game, 67–65, to earn the conference's automatic bid to the 1987 NCAA tournament.

Bracket

References

Tournament
Big Eight Conference men's basketball tournament
Big Eight Conference men's basketball tournament
Big Eight Conference men's basketball tournament